The Austin Powers franchise is a series of action-comedy films consisting of International Man of Mystery (1997), The Spy Who Shagged Me (1999) and Austin Powers in Goldmember (2002). Each film starred and was written by Canadian-English actor Mike Myers, who portrayed the titular character along with several other roles, such as Dr. Evil, Fat Bastard and Goldmember. The series has also featured Basil Exposition (Michael York), Number 2 (Robert Wagner and Rob Lowe), Frau Farbissina (Mindy Sterling), Scott Evil (Seth Green) and Vanessa Kensington (Elizabeth Hurley). The franchise was directed by Jay Roach and distributed by New Line Cinema.

The films have received mixed to positive reviews: International Man of Mystery earned a 70% "fresh" score on Rotten Tomatoes, The Spy Who Shagged Me gained 52%, and In Goldmember 55%. The films are parodies of the earlier features in the James Bond series as well as other 1960s spy films.

Austin Powers has received over 40 award nominations and over 20 wins, with one Academy Award nomination for The Spy Who Shagged Me under the category of Best Makeup and one Grammy Award nomination for Best Soundtrack Album and one Grammy win for Best Song Written for a Motion Picture, Television or Other Visual Media for Madonna's 1999 song "Beautiful Stranger". Other awards for the franchise include four MTV Movie Award wins (with eight nominations), two Teen Choice Awards (two nominations), one Saturn Award (four nominations), one Golden Globe Award nomination, three Satellite Award nominations and two Empire Award nominations.

International Man of Mystery

The Spy Who Shagged Me

In Goldmember

References
General

 
 
 

Specific

External links
 
 
 

Austin Powers
List of accolades
Warner Bros. Discovery-related lists